X-Ray is a reference tool, introduced in September 2011, that is incorporated in the Amazon Kindle Touch and later models, Kindle Fire tablets, Kindle apps for mobile platforms, Fire Phones, and Fire TVs. General reference information is preloaded into a small file on the Kindle device or app, so that when the feature is used, there is no need to access the Internet to access such content as dictionary, encyclopedic, or metadata entries, or information about actors featured in a film.

Description
X-Ray lets users explore in more depth the contents of a book. As Amazon describes: "X-Ray lets you explore the 'bones of a book.' You can also view more detailed information from Wikipedia and from Shelfari, Amazon's community-powered encyclopedia for book lovers." After Shelfari closed in 2016, information from Goodreads was displayed in the X-Ray tool.

X-Ray operates like a concordance, listing most commonly used character names, locations, themes, or ideas, which are sorted into the two main categories of "People" and "Terms". For example, readers can use it to look up the first occurrence of characters, which is often helpful in many-charactered novels.

References 

Amazon (company)
Library and information science software